Amsterdam has historically been the center of the Dutch Jewish community, and has had a continuing Jewish community for the last 370 years. Amsterdam is also known under the name "Mokum", given to the city by its Jewish inhabitants ("Mokum" is Yiddish for "town", derived from the Hebrew "makom", which literally means "place"). Although the Holocaust deeply affected the Jewish community, killing some 80% of the approximately 80,000 Jews at time present in Amsterdam, since then the community has managed to rebuild a vibrant and living Jewish life for its approximately 15,000 present members. Six of Amsterdam's mayors were Jewish. Job Cohen was runner-up for the award of World Mayor in 2006.

Marrano and Sephardic Jews

Permanent Jewish life in Amsterdam began with the arrival of pockets of Marrano and Sephardic Jews at the end of the 16th, and beginning of the 17th century; their first Chief Rabbi was Rabbi Uri Levi. Many Sephardi (Jews from the Iberian Peninsula) had been expelled from Spain in 1492 after the fall of Muslim Granada. Those that moved to Portugal were forced to leave in 1497, where they were given the choice between conversion to Catholicism or death penalty on the grounds of heresy.

From 1497, others remained in the Iberian peninsula, practising Judaism secretly in their homes. The newly independent Dutch provinces provided an ideal opportunity for these crypto-Jews to re-establish themselves and practise their religion openly, and they migrated, most notably to Amsterdam. Collectively, they brought economic growth and influence to the city as they established an international trading hub in Amsterdam during the 17th century, the so-called Dutch Golden Age. Perhaps the most notable example of Sephardic Jews in Amsterdam are the Curiel family, namely Jeromino Nunes da Costa (alias Moses Curiel), son of Jacob Curiel. Curiel was the single largest financial contributor to the building of the Portuguese Synagogue in Amsterdam. 

In 1593, Marrano Jews arrived in Amsterdam after having been refused admission to Middelburg and Haarlem. These Jews of Converso descent were important merchants, and persons of great ability. Their expertise, it can be stated, contributed materially to the prosperity of the Netherlands. They became strenuous supporters of the contender House of Orange, and were in return protected by the Stadholder. At this time, commerce in Holland was increasing; a period of development had arrived, particularly for Amsterdam, to which Jews had carried their goods and from which they maintained their relations with foreign lands. Quite new for the Netherlands, they also held connections with the Levant, Morocco and the Caribbean Antilles.

The formal independence from Spain of the Republic of the Seven United Provinces (1581), theoretically opened the door to public practice of Judaism. Yet only in 1603 did a gathering take place that was licensed by the city.  The three original congregations formed in the first two decades of the 17th century merged in 1639 to form a united Sephardic congregation.

Ashkenazim
The first Ashkenazim who arrived in Amsterdam were refugees from the Chmielnicki Uprising in Poland and the Thirty Years War. Their numbers soon swelled, eventually outnumbering the Sephardic Jews at the end of the 17th century; by 1674, some 5,000 Ashkenazi Jews were living in Amsterdam, while 2,500 Sephardic Jews called Amsterdam their home. Many of the new Ashkenazi immigrants were poor, contrary to their relatively wealthy Sephardic co-religionists. They were only allowed in Amsterdam because of the financial aid promised to them and other guarantees given to the Amsterdam city council by the Sephardic community, despite the religious and cultural differences between the Yiddish-speaking Ashkenazim and the Portuguese-speaking Sephardim.

Only in 1671 did the large Ashkenazi community inaugurate their own synagogue, the Great Synagogue, which stood opposite to the Sephardic Esnoga Synagogue. Soon after, several other synagogues were built, among them the Obbene Shul (1685-1686), the Dritt Shul (1700) and the Neie Shul (1752, also known as the New Synagogue). For a long time, the Ashkenazi community was strongly focused on Central and Eastern Europe, the region where most of the Dutch Ashkenazi originated from. Rabbis, cantors and teachers hailed from Poland and Germany. Up until the 19th century, most of the Ashkenazi Jews spoke Yiddish, with some Dutch influences. Meanwhile, the community grew and flourished. At the end of the 18th century, the 20,000-strong Ashkenazi community was one of the largest in Western and Central Europe.

The Holocaust

Occupation of Amsterdam by Nazi Germany began 10 May 1940.

Amsterdam, the largest city in the Netherlands, had an estimated 75–80,000 Jews, approximately 53–57% of the country's Jewish population. Among them was Anne Frank.

Approximately 25–35,000 of the Dutch Jews were refugees. but most of these were not in Amsterdam.

Although less than 10 percent of Amsterdam's population was Jewish, there were two seemingly contradictory outcomes:
 a general strike against mass Nazi arrests of Jews
 about 75–80% of the Jewish population was deported and murdered.

Part of the Nazi plan included consolidating the Dutch Jewish population into Amsterdam, prior to the "Final Solution."

Canadian Forces liberated Amsterdam in early 1945.

Cheider

In 1964 Adje Cohen began Jewish classes with five children in his home. This grew into an Orthodox Jewish school (Yeshiva) that provides education for children from kindergarten through high school. Many Orthodox families would have left The Netherlands if not for the existence of the Cheider : Boys and girls learn separately as orthodox Judaism requires, and the education is with a greater focus on the religious needs. By 1993 the Cheider had grown to over 230 pupils and 60 Staff members. The Cheider moved into its current building at Zeeland Street in Amsterdam Buitenveldert. Many prominent Dutch Figures attended the opening, most noteworthy was Princess Margriet who opened the new building.

Jewish community in the 21st century
Most of the Amsterdam Jewish community (excluding the Progressive and Sephardic communities) is affiliated to the Ashkenazi Nederlands Israëlitisch Kerkgenootschap. These congregations combined form the Nederlands-Israëlietische Hoofdsynagoge (NIHS) (the Dutch acronym for the Jewish Community of Amsterdam). Some 3,000 Jews are formally part of the NIHS. The Progressive movement currently has some 1,700 Jewish members in Amsterdam, affiliated to the Nederlands Verbond voor Progressief Jodendom. Smaller Jewish communities include the Sephardic Portugees-Israëlitisch Kerkgenootschap (270 families in and out of Amsterdam) and Beit Ha'Chidush, a community of some 200 members and 'friends' connected to Jewish Renewal and Reconstructionist Judaism. Several independent synagogues exist as well. The glossy Joods Jaarboek (Jewish Yearbook), is based in Amsterdam, as well as the weekly Dutch Jewish newspaper in print: the Nieuw Israëlitisch Weekblad.

Contemporary synagogues

There are functioning synagogues in Amsterdam at the following addresses.
Ashkenazi Nederlands Israëlitisch Kerkgenootschap (Modern Orthodox; Orthodox)
 Gerard Doustraat 238 (the ) (congregation Tesjoengat Israël)
  26 (the Kehillas Ja'akov)
 Jacob Obrechtplein/Heinzestraat 3 (the synagogue is called the )
 Lekstraat 61 (the  built in 1937; Charedi)
 Nieuwe Kerkstraat 149 (called the Russische sjoel or Russian Shul)
 Vasco da Gamastraat 19 (called the Synagogue West due to its location in the west of Amsterdam)
 There is also a synagogue present in Jewish nursing home Beth Shalom

Progressive Nederlands Verbond voor Progressief Jodendom (Progressive)
 Jacob Soetendorpstraat 8

Reconstructionist Beit Ha'Chidush (Jewish Renewal/Reconstructionist Judaism/Liberal Judaism)
 Nieuwe Uilenburgerstraat 91 (called the )

Sephardic Portugees-Israëlitisch Kerkgenootschap (Sephardic Judaism)
 Mr. Visserplein 3 (the Esnoga Synagogue)

Kashrut in Amsterdam
Kosher food in Amsterdam restaurants and shops is available. There is the possibility of eating kosher in Restaurant Ha-Carmel, and the well-known Sandwichshop Sal-Meijer.

Jewish culture

The Joods Historisch Museum is the center of Jewish culture in Amsterdam. Other Jewish cultural events include the Internationaal Joods Muziekfestival (International Jewish Music Festival) and the Joods Film Festival (Jewish Film Festival).

The Anne Frank House hosts a permanent exhibit on the story of Anne Frank.

Jewish cemeteries

Six Jewish cemeteries exist in Amsterdam and surroundings, three Orthodox Ashkenazi (affiliated to the NIK), two linked to the Progressive community and one Sephardic. The Ashkenazi cemetery at Muiderberg is still frequently used by the Orthodox Jewish community. The Orthodox Ashkenazi cemetery at Zeeburg, founded in 1714, was the burial ground for some 100,000 Jews between 1714 and 1942. After part of the ground of the cemetery was sold in 1956, many graves were transported to theOrthodox Ashkenazi Jewish cemetery near Diemen (also still in use, but less frequent than the one in Muiderberg). A Sephardic cemetery, Beth Haim, exists near the small town of Ouderkerk aan de Amstel, containing the graves of some 28,000 Sephardic Jews. Two Progressive cemeteries, one in Hoofddorp (founded in 1937) and one in Amstelveen (founded in 2002), are used by the large Progressive community.

See also
 History of the Jews in the Netherlands
 Jodenbreestraat
 List of Dutch Jews

References

Sources
This article incorporates text from the United States Holocaust Memorial Museum, and has been released under the GFDL.

Further reading
 Berger, Shlomo. "East European Jews in Amsterdam: Historical and Literary Anecdotes." East European Jewish Affairs 33.2 (2003): 113–120. covers 1630 to 1952
  Bodian, Miriam. Hebrews of the Portuguese Nation: Conversos & Community in Early Modern Amsterdam (1997), 219 pp. covers 1600 to 1699.
 Hofmeester, Karin. Jewish Workers & the Labour Movement: A Comparative Study of Amsterdam, London & Paris, 1870-1914 (2004). 
 Israel, Jonathan I. "The Economic Contribution of Dutch Sephardi Jewry to Holland's Golden-Age, 1595-1713." Tijdschrift voor geschiedenis 96.4 (1983): 505–535. in English.
 Kaplan, Yosef. "The Curaçao and Amsterdam Jewish Communities in the 17th and 18th Centuries." American Jewish History 72.2 (1982): 193–211.
 Klooster, Wim. "Communities of port Jews and their contacts in the Dutch Atlantic World." Jewish history 20.2 (2006): 129–145.
 Leydesdorff, Selma; and Frank Heny. We Lived with Dignity: the Jewish Proletariat of Amsterdam, 1900-1940 (1995), 278 pp. 
 Nadler, Steven M. "The Excommunication of Spinoza: Trouble and Toleration in the" Dutch Jerusalem"." Shofar: An Interdisciplinary Journal of Jewish Studies 19.4 (2001): 40-52.
 Sonnenberg-Stern, Karina. Emancipation & Poverty: The Ashkenazi Jews of Amsterdam, 1796-1850 (2000) 236 pp.
 
 Snyder, Saskia Coenen. "A narrative of absence: monumental synagogue architecture in late nineteenth-century Amsterdam." Jewish History 25.1 (2011): 43–67.
 Sutcliffe, Adam. "Identity, space and intercultural contact in the urban entrepôt: The Sephardic bounding of community in early modern Amsterdam and London." Jewish Culture and History 7.1-2 (2004): 93-108.
 Tammes, Peter. "'Hack, pack, sack': occupational structure, status, and mobility of Jews in Amsterdam 1851–1941." Journal of Interdisciplinary History 43.1 (2012): 1-26.
 Tammes Peter. “Jewish-Gentile intermarriage in pre-war Amsterdam.” History of the Family 15.3 (2010): 298–315. (
 Tammes, Peter. “Residential segregation of Jews in Amsterdam on the eve of the Shoah.” Continuity and Change 26.2 (2011): 243–270.
 Tammes, Peter. "Surviving the Holocaust: socio-demographic differences among Amsterdam Jews." European Journal of Population 33.3 (2017): 293–318.

External links

 Esnoga Website
 Jewish and Kosher Amsterdam
 Information on the NIHS
 Jewish history of Amsterdam
 Jewish Historical Museum
 United States Holocaust Memorial Museum - Amsterdam
 Amsterdam-based Jewish webshop includes info and Dutch-languages books on Jewish Amsterdam
 Story of a Dying Community: A Diary from the Amsterdam Jewish Community from the End of World War II
 The Jewish Community of Amsterdam, The Museum of the Jewish People at Beit Hatfutsot

Jewish
 
Amsterdam
Amsterdam